Bean (also known as Bean: The Ultimate Disaster Movie or Bean: The Movie) is a 1997 comedy film directed by Mel Smith and written by Richard Curtis and Robin Driscoll. Based on the British sitcom series Mr. Bean created by Rowan Atkinson and Curtis, the film stars Atkinson in the title role, with Peter MacNicol, Pamela Reed, Harris Yulin, Sandra Oh and Burt Reynolds in supporting roles. In the film, Bean works as a security guard at the National Gallery in London before being sent to the United States to talk about the unveiling of James Abbott McNeill Whistler's 1871 painting Whistler's Mother.

Produced by Gramercy Pictures, Working Title Films, and Tiger Aspect Films, Bean was released in the United Kingdom on 2 August 1997 and in the United States on 7 November 1997 by PolyGram Filmed Entertainment and Universal Pictures. The film received mixed reviews from critics but was a commercial success, having grossed $251.2 million worldwide against an $18 million budget. A standalone sequel, Mr. Bean's Holiday, was released in 2007.

Plot
Well-meaning yet clumsy and destructive Mr. Bean works as a security guard at the National Gallery in London. When the gallery's board of directors, who despise Bean for sleeping on the job, fail to fire him under the chairman's orders, they instead select Bean as their representative for the transfer of James McNeill Whistler's 1871 portrait Arrangement in Grey and Black No.1 (Whistler's Mother) to the Grierson Art Gallery in Los Angeles, purchased by philanthropist General Newton for $50 million, in an attempt to get rid of him for a while.

Grierson's curator David Langley, impressed with the false profile of "Dr. Bean", offers to accommodate Bean in his home for two months against his family's wishes. After Bean pranks the airport police by pretending to have a gun and accidentally destroys the family's prized possessions, David's wife, Alison, leaves for her mother's house along with their children, Kevin and Jennifer. David then begins to question Bean's status as an art expert following a visit to Pacific Park, where Bean is arrested by Lieutenant Brutus - the same police officer who interrogated him at the airport - after speeding up a simulator ride to make it more exciting for him. After Bean accidentally ruins a dinner with Mr. Grierson and his wife, David discovers that Bean is not a doctor and knows nothing about art.

The next day, the Whistler's Mother has finally arrived at the Los Angeles gallery but Bean accidentally sneezes on it and damages the painting with an ink-stained tissue and lacquer thinner while trying to clean it. Fearing that the damage would cost him his job and possibly get him prosecuted, David becomes despondent and gets drunk with Bean, though his family returns out of pity. That night, determined to save David's career, Bean sneaks back into the gallery, incapacitates the security guard with laxatives, and replaces the defaced Whistler's Mother with a reprinted poster of it coated in egg whites and nail polish to resemble the real one, which successfully fools everyone at the ceremony the next day. Bean gives a speech about the painting, expressing an improvised and sentimental opinion that wins the crowd's approval.

Brutus informs David that Jennifer has recently got into a motorcycle accident with her boyfriend, prompting David and Bean to rush to the hospital. While wandering around the hospital, Bean gets mistaken for a surgeon and is forced into a surgery room, where he encounters Brutus - who has been shot while dealing with a mugging on the way to the hospital - and saves his life by inadvertently removing the bullet from his body. David then begs Bean, unaware of his true identity, to wake Jennifer up from her unconscious state, which he succeeds after an accident with a defibrillator sends Bean flying and landing on her. Grateful for having their daughter back and wondering how to repay their doctor David and Alison are surprised when Bean reveals his true identity. Per Bean's suggestion, they repay him by allowing him to stay with them for one more week.

Bean spends quality time together with David and his family before David accompanies him back to the airport for his flight home to London and thanks him for everything as he departs. At home, Bean goes to sleep in his bedroom now decorated with photographs of his time in Los Angeles, as well as the original Whistler's Mother painting he smuggled back with him.

Cast

Production
In November 1991, a year after the original series premiered, Variety announced that 20th Century Fox was producing a film adaptation of Mr. Bean in association with the show's production company, Tiger Television, after the studio remade two sketches from the series into short films released theatrically, Mr. Bean Takes an Exam and Mr. Bean Goes to a Première. The film was later instead produced by the UK-based Working Title Films and PolyGram Filmed Entertainment, under the latter's Gramercy Pictures banner.

Deleted and alternative scenes
The North American release differs from the international release, as it includes an additional scene in which David suggests that Bean stuff the turkey while he distracts the Griersons during the dinner party. After losing his watch in the turkey, Bean gets his head stuck inside of it (a recycled gag from "Merry Christmas Mr. Bean") and stumbles blindly around the kitchen and the dining room.

The international release includes two alternate scenes on either side of the deleted turkey scene in order to explain its absence. When searching the refrigerator, Bean first finds two frankfurters and then the onion that he offers as an appetizer. Upon finding the turkey, David asks him if he has cooked a turkey before and he replies, "Oh yes." After the two shove the turkey into the microwave oven, Bean suggests running it for 20 minutes as opposed to the 5-hour cooking time suggested by David, which cause the turkey to explode.

According to Atkinson in the documentary Bean Scenes Unseen, the differing scenes were the result of very different reactions from the North American and international audiences in test screenings.

Music

The film score was composed and conducted by Howard Goodall, who also composed the original Mr. Bean series, although the original Mr. Bean theme was unused. Cover versions on the soundtrack album include the Beatles' "Yesterday" (sung by Wet Wet Wet), the OMC cover of "I Love L.A." (though Randy Newman's original version is the one heard in the film), and Alice Cooper's "Elected", performed by Iron Maiden lead singer Bruce Dickinson. "Elected" features sound dubs of Mr. Bean making campaign promises and was previously used in Comic Relief in 1992.

Boyzone released a single from the film titled "Picture of You".

Reception

Box office
Bean opened in Australia on 3 July 1997 and grossed $3.1 million in its opening weekend from 193 screens with a $16,062 per-theater average, placing number one for the weekend. It remained number one for a second week. In the UK, it opened on 8 August 1997 on 345 screens and grossed £2,563,326 ($4.0 million) (including previews of £284,936) with a £7,430 ($11,719) per-theater average, finishing second for the weekend behind the second weekend of Men in Black. It was the highest opening gross for a British production surpassing the £1.4 million opening of Four Weddings and a Funeral. In Germany, it grossed 12.3 million Deutsche mark ($6.8 million) from 682 screens with a $9,998 per-theater average to take the number one spot, beating fellow opener The Fifth Element. It remained number one for a second week in Germany. It became the fastest UK film to gross $100 million and reached that milestone before opening in the US. 

It opened in Canada on 17 October 1997 in 242 theaters and grossed $2,255,233 with a $9,319 per-theater average and ranking number 10 at the US and Canadian box office, the first Canadian only release to reach the US and Canadian top 10. On its release in the United States on 7 November 1997, the film grossed $12,733,827 in its opening weekend while playing in 1,948 theaters, with a $6,536 per-theater average and ranking second behind Starship Troopers. Due to the R rating of Starship Troopers, its underperformance and Bean exceeding expectations, there were claims that under 17s may have bought tickets for Bean and snuck in to see Starship Troopers. 

By the end its theatrical run, the film had grossed £17,902,161 in the UK, the fourth highest-grossing film for the year. It grossed $45,319,423 in the United States and Canada and $251,212,670 worldwide.

Critical response
On Rotten Tomatoes, the film holds an approval rating of 43% based on 35 reviews with an average rating of 5.3/10. The site's critical consensus reads: "Bean boasts a terrifically talented physical comedian in the title role, but his constant mugging and silly slapstick quickly wear thin." On Metacritic the film holds a score of 52 out of 100 based on 20 critics, indicating "mixed or average reviews".

Roger Ebert gave the film two-and-a-half stars out of four, saying that while he praised the film for having "many moments that were very funny", he criticized the film's runtime of 90 minutes, saying it was too long: "At an hour, Bean would have been nonstop laughs. [But] then they added 30 minutes of stops."

Sequel
A standalone sequel, titled Mr. Bean's Holiday, was released in 2007, ten years after its predecessor's release.

See also
 Musée d'Orsay, Paris, the actual location of the 1871 artwork Whistler's Mother

References

External links

1997 films
1990s English-language films
1997 comedy films
1997 independent films
American independent films
American comedy films
British independent films
British comedy films
Films directed by Mel Smith
Films produced by Tim Bevan
Films produced by Eric Fellner
Films with screenplays by Richard Curtis
Films based on television series
Films set in London
Films set in Los Angeles
Films set in museums
Films set in hospitals
Films set in amusement parks
Films set in airports
Films set on airplanes
Films shot in England
Films shot in London
Films shot in Los Angeles
Mr. Bean
Working Title Films films
Tiger Aspect Productions films
PolyGram Filmed Entertainment films
Gramercy Pictures films
1990s American films
1990s British films